The Uffizi Gallery is a prominent art museum located adjacent to the Piazza della Signoria in the Historic Centre of Florence in the region of Tuscany, Italy. One of the most important Italian museums and the most visited, it is also one of the largest and best known in the world and holds a collection of priceless works, particularly from the period of the Italian Renaissance.

After the ruling House of Medici died out, their art collections were given to the city of Florence under the famous Patto di famiglia negotiated by Anna Maria Luisa, the last Medici heiress.  The Uffizi is one of the first modern museums. The gallery had been open to visitors by request since the sixteenth century, and in 1765 it was officially opened to the public, formally becoming a museum in 1865.

History

The building of the Uffizi complex was begun by Giorgio Vasari in 1560 for Cosimo I de' Medici's as a means to consolidate his administrative control of the various committees, agencies, and guilds established in Florence's Republican past so as to accommodate them all one place, hence the name , "offices". The construction was later continued by Alfonso Parigi and Bernardo Buontalenti; it was completed in 1581. The top floor was made into a gallery for the family and their guests and included their collection of Roman sculptures.

The cortile (internal courtyard) is so long, narrow and open to the Arno at its far end through a Doric screen that articulates the space without blocking it, that architectural historians treat it as the first regularized streetscape of Europe. Vasari, a painter and architect as well, emphasised its perspective length by adorning it with the matching facades' continuous roof cornices, and unbroken cornices between storeys, as well as the three continuous steps on which the palace-fronts stand. The niches in the piers that alternate with columns of the Loggiato  filled with sculptures of famous artists in the 19th century.

The Uffizi brought together under one roof the administrative offices and the Archivio di Stato, the state archive. The project was intended to display prime art works of the Medici collections on the piano nobile; the plan was carried out by his son, Grand Duke Francesco I. He commissioned the architect Buontalenti to design the Tribuna degli Uffizi that would display a series of masterpieces in one room, including jewels; it became a highly influential attraction of a Grand Tour. The octagonal room was completed in 1584.

Over the years, more sections of the palace were recruited to exhibit paintings and sculpture collected or commissioned by the Medici. 
For many years, 45 to 50 rooms were used to display paintings from the 13th to 18th century.

Modern times
Because of its huge collection, some of the Uffizi's works have in the past been transferred to other museums in Florence—for example, some famous statues to the Bargello. A project was finished in 2006 to expand the museum's exhibition space some 6,000 metres2 (64,000 ft2) to almost 13,000 metres2 (139,000 ft2), allowing public viewing of many artworks that had usually been in storage.

The Nuovi Uffizi (New Uffizi) renovation project which started in 1989 was progressing well in 2015 to 2017. It was intended to modernize all of the halls and more than double the display space. As well, a new exit was planned and the lighting, air conditioning and security systems were updated. During construction, the museum remained open, although rooms were closed as necessary with the artwork temporarily moved to another location. For example, the Botticelli rooms and two others with early Renaissance paintings were closed for 15 months but reopened in October 2016.

The major modernization project, New Uffizi, had increased viewing capacity to 101 rooms by late 2016 by expanding into areas previously used by the Florence State Archive.

The Uffizi hosted over two million visitors in 2016, making it the most visited art gallery in Italy. In high season (particularly in July), waiting times can be up to five hours. Tickets are available on-line in advance, however, to significantly reduce the waiting time. A new ticketing system is currently being tested to reduce queuing times from hours to just minutes. The museum is being renovated to more than double the number of rooms used to display artwork.

Due to the COVID-19 pandemic, the museum was closed for 150 days in 2020, and attendance plunged by 72 percent to 659,043.  Nonetheless, the Uffizi was twenty-seventh in the list of most-visited art museums in the world in 2020. Works from the Uffizi gallery collection are now available for remote viewing on Google Arts and Culture. The museum reopened in May 2021 following a renovation that included an addition of 14 new rooms and a display of additional 129 artworks, with the museum attempting to give more voice to historically underrepresented groups that include women and people of color.

Incidents
On 27 May 1993, the Sicilian Mafia carried out a car bomb explosion in Via dei Georgofili which damaged parts of the palace and killed five people. The blast destroyed five pieces of art and damaged another 30. Some of the paintings were fully protected by bulletproof glass. The most severe damage was to the Niobe room and classical sculptures and neoclassical interior, which have since been restored, although its frescoes were damaged beyond repair.

Key works

The collection also contains some ancient sculptures, such as the Arrotino, the Two Wrestlers and the Bust of Severus Giovanni.

Gallery

See also
 Collections of the Uffizi

References

External links
 
Virtual tour of the Uffizi provided by Google Arts & Culture

 

1580s establishments the Grand Duchy of Tuscany
1581 establishments in Italy
1765 establishments in Italy
Art museums and galleries in Florence
Art museums established in 1765
Buildings and structures completed in 1581
National museums of Italy
Palaces in Florence
Renaissance architecture in Florence